Soyma is a rural locality (a village) in Golovinskoye Rural Settlement, Sudogodsky District, Vladimir Oblast, Russia. The population was 391 as of 2010. There are 6 streets.

Geography 
Soyma is located on the Soyma River, 10 km northwest of Sudogda (the district's administrative centre) by road. Penki is the nearest rural locality.

References 

Rural localities in Sudogodsky District